Khoirul Mashuda (born August 8, 1982) is an Indonesian footballer who currently plays for Deltras FC in the Indonesia Super League.

References

External links

1982 births
Association football midfielders
Living people
Indonesian footballers
Liga 1 (Indonesia) players
Deltras F.C. players
Indonesian Premier Division players
Persiraja Banda Aceh players
Persisam Putra Samarinda players